John Greenwood (died 1609) was an English schoolmaster.

Greenwood was matriculated as a pensioner of St. John's College, Cambridge, in 1558; removed to Catharine Hall, of which he was afterwards fellow; proceeded B.A. in 1561–62, and commenced M.A. in 1565. He became master of the grammar school at Brentwood, Essex, where he appears to have died at an advanced age in 1609. His only work is Syntaxis et Prosodia, versiculis compositæ, Cambridge, 1590, 8vo.

References

Further reading
D. Shanahan, "Brentwood School and the Greenwood family, 1570–1645," Essex Recusant, 5 (1963), 4–11.

16th-century births
1609 deaths
16th-century English educators
17th-century English educators
Alumni of St John's College, Cambridge
Alumni of St Catharine's College, Cambridge
Fellows of St Catharine's College, Cambridge
People from Brentwood, Essex
16th-century English writers
17th-century English writers
16th-century male writers
17th-century English male writers
English male writers